The third season of the talent show The Voice of Switzerland premiered on January 27, 2020 on 3+. The four new coaches were the House-DJ and music producer DJ Antoine, the singer-songwriter Anna Rossinelli, the band musician Noah Veraguth and the duo Büetzer Buebe consisting of the two dialect singers Gölä and Trauffer. The two new hosts were Christa Rigozzi and Max Loong.

Remo Forrer from team Noah Veraguth, was named the winner of the season on April 6, 2020.

Teams
Colour key:
  Winner
  Runner-up
  Eliminated in the Sing Off
  Eliminated in the Battles

Blind auditions
The castings for the third season took place in spring 2019, but were not shown on television. The blind auditions were from 26 to 29 November 2019 in Nobeo-Studio in Hürth in Cologne recorded and aired from January 27 to March 9, 2020 to seven episodes.

Battle rounds
The battle rounds were recorded on January 23 and 24, 2020 in Hürth and broadcast on three episodes from March 16 to 30, 2020.

Color key

Sing offs
The sign offs were recorded on January 23 and 24, 2020 in Hürth and broadcast on three episodes from March 16 to 30, 2020, with the battle rounds episodes.

Color key

Final
The live show final was originally scheduled to take place on March 30, 2020 in Hürth, but all events were canceled there due to the coronavirus pandemic. Instead, the final was broadcast on April 6, 2020, showing the candidates, coaches, and presenters with footage from their living rooms.

References

External links
 Official website on 3plus.tv
 The Voice of Switzerland on fernsehserien.de

2020 television seasons